John Stephen Jones (born June 21, 1964 in Danville, Arkansas) is the executive vice president, CEO, and director of player personnel for the Dallas Cowboys of the National Football League (NFL). He is the son of Dallas Cowboys owner Jerry Jones, and the older brother of Cowboys executives Jerry Jones Jr. and Charlotte Jones Anderson.

Jones graduated from the University of Arkansas with a degree in chemical engineering in 1988. During his collegiate career, he was a member of Phi Delta Theta. He was a 4-year letterman for the Razorbacks, playing linebacker and on special teams, and started in the 1987 Orange Bowl.

References

Living people
Dallas Cowboys executives
1964 births
People from Danville, Arkansas
University of Arkansas alumni
Arkansas Razorbacks football players
Jones family (American football)